From the Machine is a various artists compilation album released in 1990 by Index Productions.

Music
Several bands represented on From the Machine later re-released their songs in their own albums. "Mine Eyes" by Switchblade Symphony was later released on the band's debut 1991 EP Fable and 1995 album Serpentine Gallery. The track "Pharmaceutical" by Grotus was later mixed again and released on their 1991 debut studio album Brown. Diatribe's track "Cockeyed Motherfucker" also appeared on the 1990 A Reason for Living compilation and on the band's debut EP Therapy the following year.

Reception
The Fifth Path gave From the Machine a positive review, chose Switchblade Symphony's contribution as a favorite and also said "I'm giving Sharkbait special mention for being "different," something like a mix of rap, rock and Nitzer Ebb."

Track listing

Personnel
Adapted from the From the Machine liner notes.

Release history

References

External links 
 

1990 compilation albums